Mount Hurley is a snow-covered massif with steep bare slopes on the west side, standing  south of Cape Ann and  south of Mount Biscoe, Antarctica. It was discovered in January 1930 by the British Australian New Zealand Antarctic Research Expedition of 1929–31 under Mawson, who named it for Captain James Francis (Frank) Hurley, a photographer with the expedition. Hurley also served with the Australasian Antarctic Expedition under Mawson, 1911–14, and with the Imperial Trans-Antarctic Expedition under Ernest Shackleton, 1914–17.

See also
Rudmose Brown Peak

References

Mountains of Enderby Land